The Banqueting House may refer to:

 Banqueting House, Gibside, part of the former Gibside estate, near Newcastle upon Tyne
 Banqueting House, Whitehall, London

See also 
 Banqueting house, a type of building in English architecture
 Mansion House, London, the official residence of the Lord Mayor of London, which hosts official annual banquets